Rufus Crosby Kemper Jr. (February 22, 1927 – January 2, 2014) was an American banker and philanthropist.

Career
Kemper was born into an influential banking and railroading family in Kansas City, Missouri. His father was Rufus Crosby Kemper Sr. He attended Southwest High School in Kansas City, then transferred to Phillips Academy in Andover, Massachusetts where he graduated in 1945. After returning from service in World War II, Mr. Kemper enrolled in the University of Missouri and became a member of the Zeta Phi chapter of Beta Theta Pi.

In 1950, Kemper went to work for the United Missouri Bank, which later became UMB Financial Corporation. He later became president in 1959. He ran for the U.S. Senate in 1962 on the Republican ticket and in the same year chaired the Kansas City Industrial Committee. He was active in the running of the Kemper Museum of Contemporary Art, which was named for him. He retired as chairman of UMB in 2004.

Personal
Kemper died at age 86 on January 2, 2014, at Indian Wells, California. He had seven children with wives Cynthia Warrick Kemper and Mary "Bebe" Stripp Kemper, including Crosby Kemper III and Mariner Kemper.

On June 18, 1965, Kemper and his wife Mary Kemper adopted son Sandy Kemper in Chicago Illinois. Kemper was a first cousin, twice removed, of actress Ellie Kemper.

References

External links
University of Missouri biography
Bizjournals profile
Kansas City Business Hall of Fame profile

American art collectors
Museum founders
American philanthropists
1927 births
2014 deaths
R. Crosby Jr
American bank presidents
Businesspeople from Kansas City, Missouri
University of Missouri alumni
Missouri Republicans
20th-century American businesspeople